Susan Mary Simcock  (25 November 1938 – 29 May 2020) was a New Zealand sports administrator who served as president of the World Squash Federation from 1996 to 2002.

In the 2004 Queen's Birthday Honours, Simcock was appointed an Officer of the New Zealand Order of Merit, for services to sports administration and squash.

References

1938 births
2020 deaths
New Zealand sports executives and administrators
Women sports executives and administrators
Officers of the New Zealand Order of Merit